The Clan is a 1920 German silent drama film directed by Carl Wilhelm and starring Ressel Orla, Johannes Riemann and Conrad Veidt.

Cast
In alphabetical order
Josefine Dora as President of the Kaffeeklatsch-Clubs
Loo Hardy
Charles Willy Kayser
Ressel Orla
Harald Paulsen
Hedwig Pauly-Winterstein
Martha Rhema
Johannes Riemann
Artúr Somlay
Conrad Veidt
Hedwig von Lorée

References

External links

Films of the Weimar Republic
German silent feature films
Films directed by Carl Wilhelm
German black-and-white films
1920 drama films
German drama films
Terra Film films
Silent drama films
1920s German films
1920s German-language films